Old Mother Riley is a 1937 British comedy film directed by Oswald Mitchell and starring Arthur Lucan in the lead,  with Kitty McShane, Barbara Everest, Patrick Ludlow and Hubert Leslie. Mother Riley and her daughter stop the plans of some disinherited relatives to overturn the terms of a will.

This is the first in a series of films made between 1937–1952, featuring Arthur Lucan's elderly drag character, and her daughter Kitty. After small roles in the Irish Kathleen Mavourneen (also 1937), Lucan and McShane were approached to star in their own film, Old Mother Riley. The film was cheaply made (it cost £2,000, taking six weeks to shoot) and based on their music hall sketch ‘The Matchseller’. Old Mother Riley was a box office success and Old Mother Riley in Paris soon followed.

Plot
In his will, a  wealthy match magnate leaves his fortune to his family, the only condition being that they must take in  the first person they see selling matches. Very soon they are blessed with the presence of a loud Irish washerwoman, Old Mother Riley. Chaos ensues, as her presence in the household, and that of her daughter, Kitty, proves unwelcome.

Cast
 Arthur Lucan – Mrs Riley
 Kitty McShane – Kitty Riley
 Barbara Everest – Mrs Briggs
 Patrick Ludlow – Edwin Briggs
 Hubert Leslie – Captain Lawson
 Edith Sharpe – Matilda Lawson
 Syd Crossley – Butler
 Edgar Driver – Bill Jones
 Dorothy Vernon – Aggie Sparks

Critical reception
TV Guide commented that "far from being impressive cinema, the "Old Mother Riley" series provided for some innocuous and occasionally hysterical entertainment."

References

External links
 

1937 films
1937 comedy films
British comedy films
British black-and-white films
Films directed by Oswald Mitchell
1930s English-language films
1930s British films